Mount Pleasant, Saint Croix is a settlement on the island of Saint Croix in the United States Virgin Islands.

References

External links
 Source

Populated places in Saint Croix, U.S. Virgin Islands
Plantations in the Danish West Indies